The Procuress may refer to:

 The Procuress (Cranach)
 The Procuress (Dirck van Baburen)
 The Procuress (Vermeer)